James Francis Murphy  (12 March 189318 January 1949) was a senior Australian public servant, best known for his role as Secretary of the Department of Commerce (later Department of Commerce and Agriculture) in the 1930s and 1940s.

Life and career
Frank Murphy was born in Carlton, Melbourne on 12 March 1893. In 1910, he joined the Commonwealth Public Service in the Department of External Affairs.

In 1933, Murphy was appointed as Assistant Secretary to the Department of Commerce—his promotion at the time was challenged by several other public servants who believed that they should win the role on the grounds that they had served for longer.

From December 1934 when he was appointed to the position, until December 1942 when the Department was abolished, Murphy was Secretary of the Department of Commerce. He was then appointed Secretary of the Department of Commerce and Agriculture, between 1942 and 1945.

Between 1941 and 1943, Murphy was also Secretary of the Department of Transport. In the role he did not participate in the detailed work of the department as his focus was on the commerce department.

Murphy died on 18 January 1949 in Balwyn, Melbourne.

Awards
In May 1937, Murphy was appointed a Companion of the Order of St Michael and St George, for his service as Secretary of the Department of Commerce.

References

1893 births
1949 deaths
Australian public servants
Australian Companions of the Order of St Michael and St George
People from Carlton, Victoria
Public servants from Melbourne